The Curse of Drink is a 1922 American silent drama film directed by Harry O. Hoyt and starring Harry T. Morey, Edmund Breese and  Marguerite Clayton. It is based on the 1904 play The Curse of Drink by Charles E. Blaney.

Synopsis
A former top railroad engineer succumbs to an addiction to bootleg liquor with unfortunate consequences for himself and his stenographer daughter.

Cast
 Harry T. Morey as Bill Sanford
 Edmund Breese as John Rand
 Marguerite Clayton as 	Ruth Sanford
 George Fawcett as 	Ben Flartey
 Miriam Battista as Baby Betty
 Brinsley Shaw as 	Sam Handy
 Alice May as 	Mother Sanford
 Albert L. Barrett as 	Harry Rand
 June Fuller as 	Margaret Sanford

References

Bibliography
 Munden, Kenneth White. The American Film Institute Catalog of Motion Pictures Produced in the United States, Part 1. University of California Press, 1997.

External links

1922 films
1922 drama films
Silent American drama films
Films directed by Harry O. Hoyt
American silent feature films
1920s English-language films
American black-and-white films
1920s American films